Richard Rockett (born 1931) is an Irish retired hurler who played as a right wing-forward for the Kilkenny senior team.

Born in Slieverue, County Kilkenny, Rockett first played competitive hurling during his schooling at De La Salle College. He arrived on the inter-county scene at the age of twenty when he first linked up with the Kilkenny junior team. He made his senior debut in the 1953-54 National League. Rockett played a key role for the team for the next few years and won one All-Ireland medal and two Leinster medals.

Rockett also represented the Leinster inter-provincial team on a number of occasions, winning one Railway Cup medal.  At club level he was a one-time championship medallist with Slieverue.

His retirement came prior to the start of the 1959 championship.

Honours

Team

Slieverue
Kilkenny Senior Hurling Championship (1): 1954

Kilkenny
All-Ireland Senior Hurling Championship (1): 1957
Leinster Senior Hurling Championship (2): 1957, 1958
Oireachtas Cup (1): 1957
All-Ireland Junior Hurling Championship (1): 1951
Leinster Junior Hurling Championship (1): 1951

Leinster
Railway Cup (1): 1956

References

1931 births
Living people
Slieverue hurlers
Kilkenny inter-county hurlers
All-Ireland Senior Hurling Championship winners